Ninja Gaiden, released in Japan as  and in Europe as Shadow Warriors, is a 1988 side-scrolling beat-'em-up game, originally released by Tecmo as a coin-operated arcade video game. It was first released in North America and Europe in late 1988, and then in Japan in February 1989.  It was the first game released in the Ninja Gaiden franchise. The arcade game was a major commercial success in North America, becoming the highest-grossing arcade conversion kit of 1989 in the United States.

Plot
Ninja Gaiden is a side-scrolling beat-'em-up in which the player controls a ninja hired by the United States government to defeat an evil cult led by Bladedamus, a descendant of Nostradamus who seeks to fulfill his end of the world prophecies. Flooding the streets of the United States with criminals released from Alcatraz, Bladedamus has kidnapped the President and acquired codes for launching the nation's ICBMs.

Gameplay

The first player controls a ninja dressed in blue, while the second player controls one dressed in orange. Like most beat-'em-ups, players proceed through stages by defeating enemies scattered through each area.

The controls consist of an eight-way joystick with a button installed on top and two additional action buttons for attacking and jumping. The button on top of the joystick allows the player character to grab onto any overhead bar or tightrope and hang from there. There are five primary techniques performed by pressing the joystick and buttons individually or in combination with each other.

The player can destroy certain objects in the environment (such as telephone booths, signposts, dumpsters) by knocking or throwing enemies onto them. These will uncover hidden items that will award the player with bonus points, health recovery, time extensions and even an extra life. One particular item will temporarily arm the player with a sword that can be used up to ten times before reverting to his standard punches and kicks.

The first five stages are based on actual American cities and landmarks such as Los Angeles, New York City, Las Vegas, North Carolina, the Grand Canyon, and a transcontinental railroad. The sixth and final stage is set inside the enemy's hideout. The final boss, Bladedamus, wields two swords and has a fire breath attack.

Ports

The Ninja Gaiden arcade game was produced and released almost simultaneously with its home console counterpart for the Nintendo Entertainment System, although they are different games with only a few similarities. The designer of the arcade game is only credited as "Strong Shima", but Masato Kato, who worked on the NES version, identified him as one "Mr. Iijima".

In Europe, home versions of Ninja Gaiden were released under the Shadow Warriors title in 1990 by Ocean Software for five different computer platforms (Amiga, Atari ST, Commodore 64, ZX Spectrum, and Amstrad CPC). In North America, it was published for the IBM PC by Hi-Tech Expressions, and as a single-player game for the Atari Lynx console by BlueSky Software. The arcade version of Ninja Gaiden is also included as a hidden bonus game in Ninja Gaiden Black for the Xbox in 2005. 

This game was ported to the Nintendo Wii as a downloadable Virtual Console Arcade game and released in Japan on July 28, 2009, in PAL regions on November 13, and in North America on December 21. A Nintendo Switch port was released as part of the Arcade Archive series on May 9, 2019.

Reception

The arcade game was a major commercial success in North America, becoming the highest-grossing arcade conversion kit of 1989 in the United States. In Japan, Game Machine listed Ninja Gaiden on their March 15, 1989 issue as being the second most-successful table arcade unit of the month.

The arcade game was well received by critics. Nick Kelly of Commodore User called it "the next generation for Double Dragon fans" with praise for the controls, background variety and two-player mode, but with some criticism towards the "slightly washed-out" graphics and "gory" continue screen. Computer and Video Games called it a "slick beat 'em up" similar to Bad Dudes vs. Dragon Ninja (1988) with "smooth" graphics and "masses of action" that is "great fun" in two-player mode, despite the lack of originality.

Reviewing the Atari Lynx version, Robert A. Jung with IGN said the story was irrelevant and the game was a scaled down version of the arcade original. He praised the graphics but in his final verdict he wrote that "Ninja Gaiden is not a bad game; it's just not a good game, either."
Rob Swan with Computer and Video Games said the game was exactly the same as the arcade coin-op and felt the game was a little short of superb but really addictive.
Les Ellis gave the game a positive review in Raze.

Reviewing the ZX Spectrum version, Your Sinclair praised the colorful graphics and interactive backgrounds. Crash liked the animation, but had grown tired of the genre. Sinclair User summed it up with "there isn't really a speck of originality about Shadow Warriors. Nonetheless, it will be a stiff challenge." Reviewing the Amiga and Spectrum versions, C+VG highlighted the music and sound effects.

See also
 Rygar, another Tecmo game referenced in background graffiti

References

External links
 Ninja Gaiden at the Killer List of Videogames
Ninja Gaiden at MobyGames
 Ninja Gaiden at Gaming-History

1988 video games
Amiga games
Amstrad CPC games
Arcade video games
Brooklyn in fiction
Commodore 64 games
Cooperative video games
DOS games
Nintendo Switch games
Ninja Gaiden games
Ocean Software games
PlayStation 4 games
Side-scrolling beat 'em ups
Tecmo games
Video games developed in Japan
Video games set in 1999
Video games set in Arizona
Video games set in Los Angeles
Video games set in New York City
Virtual Console games
ZX Spectrum games
Video games set in the Las Vegas Valley
Hamster Corporation games